Loud and Clear is the third studio album by American glam metal band Autograph, released in 1987. It would be the final album to feature original material by all five original members. The band would not issue another release until 1997. Two of the tracks featured on this album, "Dance all Night" and "She Never Looked that Good For Me" appeared (alongside with the band members themselves) in the 1987 fantasy-comedy film Like Father Like Son, released the same year. The original album issue, by RCA Records is out of print. The album was reissued on CD in 2006 by Rock Candy Records. 

Loud and Clear ultimately proved unsuccessful, with the album (or any other releases) proving to be as commercially successful their 1984 debut the album failed in sales and subsequently the band went on a long hiatus.

The title track "Loud and Clear" has a music video with Ozzy Osbourne and Vince Neil as extras.

Track listing

Personnel

Autograph 
Steve Plunkett - vocals, rhythm guitar
Steve Lynch - guitar, backing vocals
Randy Rand - bass, backing vocals
Steven Isham - keyboards, backing vocals
Keni Richards - drums

Charts

References

1987 albums
Autograph (American band) albums
Albums produced by Andy Johns
RCA Records albums